San Ildefonso Ixtahuacán is a municipality in the Guatemalan department of Huehuetenango, situated at 1580 metres above sea level, with the town of Ixtahuacán as the municipal seat. The municipality has a population of 44,424 (2018 census) and covers an area of 135 km2. The annual festival is January 20–25.

References

External links
Muni in Spanish

Municipalities of the Huehuetenango Department